Civic 10 was a political party in San Marino. It has been described as left-leaning and populist, and also advocated for e-democracy and a basic income.

History
The party was established on 30 July 2012 and contested the 2012 general elections as part of the Active Citizenship alliance. It received 6.7% of the vote, winning four seats.

The party was pro-European, and supported the positive of San Marino joining the European Union in the 2013 referendum. 

The party contested the 2016 general election as a member of the Adesso.sm, winning 9.3% the vote and – due to the majority bonus system – gaining six seats.

In the 2019 general election, the party was a component of the Libera San Marino alliance, which won 16.5% of the votes and ten seats, of which Civic 10 took five.

The Civic 10 Movement dissolved on 14 November 2020 due to the formation of Libera San Marino as a unitary party.

Election results

Grand and General Council

References

External links
Official website

2012 establishments in San Marino
Defunct political parties in San Marino
Democratic socialist parties in Europe
Political parties disestablished in 2020
Political parties established in 2012
Pro-European political parties in San Marino